Operating certificate is a category of license issued by a government agency allowing an individual or company to provide a controlled type of service.  These certificates are generally issued for a limited time period.  Certificates can have intrinsic value and in some cases can be sold.

The term can be used to describe the document issued to operate any of the following:

Airline; (known as an Air Operator's Certificate) the authority to operate an airline
Airport; in the United States, the authority to operate an airport
Adult care facility; generally issued by a local authority
Transportation company; generally issued by a local authority

References 

Licenses